François-Marie Banier (born ) is a French novelist, playwright, artist, actor and photographer. He is particularly known for his photographs of celebrities and other public figures and for his friendships with members of high society. In a prominent legal case, in 2016 he was convicted of 'abuse of weakness' of the elderly billionaire Liliane Bettencourt.

Life and career
Banier was born in Paris, France. He grew up in a middle-class family in the 16th arrondissement of Paris. He has claimed he had been "completely incomprehensible to [his] parents".

Despite his modest background, from an early age he was a precocious and hyperactive talent, who was able to develop friendships with some of Paris' wealthiest arts patrons and artists. At the age of 16, he met Salvador Dalí, who would send his car to bring Banier to his suite at the Hotel Meurice to discuss art. At the age of 19, he befriended the wealthy heiress and patron of the arts Marie-Laure de Noailles who was then 64.

Banier published his first novel, Les Résidences secondaires ou la Vie distraite (Second Homes or Distracted Life), at the age of 22. Around the same time, a well-known Parisian designer and antique dealer Madeleine Castaing Collected some of his photographs.

Over the years, Banier befriended many well-known public figures and celebrities, including Yves Saint Laurent, Pierre Cardin, Françoise Sagan, Samuel Beckett, Vladimir Horowitz, Louis Aragon, François Mitterrand, Kate Moss, Mick Jagger and Princess Caroline of Monaco. He is a friend of Johnny Depp and his ex-wife Vanessa Paradis, whom he met at his home in the south of France. Banier is godfather to their daughter, Lily-Rose. As of 2008 he shared his house with actor Pascal Greggory and his nephew Martin d’Orgeval.

Relationship with Liliane Bettencourt
In 1987, Banier was commissioned to photograph Liliane Bettencourt and Federico Fellini for the French magazine Egoiste. Bettencourt was one of the principal shareholders of L'Oréal and one of the wealthiest persons in the world with an estimated fortune of US$40.1 billion. Over the ensuing years, Banier and Bettencourt became friends and she became his chief benefactor, bestowing gifts upon him estimated to be worth as much as €1.3 billion. These gifts included a life insurance policy worth €253 million in 2003, another life insurance policy worth €262 million in 2006, 11 works of art in 2001 valued at €20 million, including paintings by Picasso, Matisse, Mondrian, Delaunay and Léger and a photograph by surrealist Man Ray and cash. The life insurance policies were allegedly signed over to Banier after Bettencourt was recovering from two hospital stays in 2003 and 2006.

In December 2007, Françoise Bettencourt Meyers, the daughter of Bettencourt, lodged a criminal complaint against Banier, accusing him of abus de faiblesse (or the exploitation of a physical or psychological weakness for personal gain) over Bettencourt. As a result of her complaint, the Brigade Financière, the financial investigative arm of the French national police, opened an investigation and, after interviewing members of Bettencourt's staff, determined to present the case to a court in Nanterre for trial in September 2009. In December 2009, the court delayed ruling on the case until April 2010 (later extended until July 2010) pending the results of a medical examination of Bettencourt's mental state. However, Bettencourt refused to submit to these examinations.

In July 2010, the trial was adjourned again until autumn 2010, at the earliest, after details of tape recordings made by Bettencourt's butler became public. The tapes allegedly reveal that Bettencourt had made Banier her "sole heir" (excluding the L'Oréal shares which made up the bulk of her estate and which had already been signed over to her daughter and two grandsons). Bettencourt later removed Banier from her will.

In 2015 Banier was convicted of 'abuse of weakness' of Liliane Bettincourt, prosecutor Gérard Aldigé stating he had "imposed his control over her like a spider spinning its web. And once he had her in his net, he never let her go. She became his thing. He dealt with her like a vampire." Banier was sentenced to two and a half years prison, and ordered to pay €158 million in damages to Liliane Bettencourt. Seven other defendants, including Liliane Bettencourt’s financial advisor, lawyer, and notary, were also convicted and given lesser sentences.

Banier appealed. The second trial, which concluded in May 2016, upheld the conviction, but reduced his sentence to four years suspended and a €375,000 fine, cancelling the other damages.

In 2019, a judge dismissed the remaining charges against him.

Selected works

Novels
 Les Résidences Secondaires, Grasset, 1969
 Le Passé composé, Grasset, 1971
 La Tête la première, Grasset, 1972
 Balthazar, fils de famille, Gallimard, 1985, Grand prix des lectrices de Elle
 Sur un air de fête, Gallimard, 1990
 Les Femmes du métro Pompe, Gallimard, 2006
 Johnny Dasolo, Gallimard, 2008

Plays
 Hôtel du lac, Gallimard, 1975
 Nous ne connaissons pas la même personne, Grasset, 1978
 Je ne t'ai jamais aimé, Gallimard, 2000

Photography 
 Photographies, Gallimard/Denoël, 1991
 Past-Present, William Morrow, New York, 1996 ; Schirmer/Mosel, Munich 1997
 Vivre, São Paulo, Pinacoteca do Estado ; Rio de Janeiro, Museum de Arte Moderna, 1999
 François-Marie Banier, Tokyo Metropolitan Museum of Photography, Asahi Schimbun, 2000
 Brésil, Gallimard, 2001
 François-Marie Banier, Miami Beach, Bass Museum of Art ; Gallimard, 2003
 Le Chanteur muet des rues, en collaboration avec Erri de Luca, éd. Martin d'Orgeval, Gallimard, 2006
 Perdre la tête, Die schönsten deutschen Bücher (Prix du meilleur livre allemand, section photographie), 2006 ; Silver Crown Award, Moscou, 2007
 Vive la vie, with photographs of Natalia Vodianova. Steidl, Göttingen, Germany, 2008. .
 Beckett, Steidl, 2009

Art exhibitions 
 1991 : Musée national d'Art moderne, Centre Georges-Pompidou, Paris
 1994 : Bunkamera Gallery, Tokyo ; galerie Beatrice Wassermann, Munich
 1997 : Villa Farnèse, Rome
 1998 : Private Heroes, Württembergischer Kunstverein, Stuttgart
 2000 : Fotos y Pinturas, musée national des Beaux Arts d'Argentine, Buenos Aires
 2001 : Täglich Neues, musée Ludwig ; Coblence ; Budapest
 2003 : Maison européenne de la photographie, Paris
 2003 : Transphotographiques, Lille, Crypte de la Cathédrale de la Treille
 2005 : Perdre la tête, Académie de France à Rome, Villa Medici
 2006 : True Stories, Istanbul Modern, Istanbul
 2007 : Perdre la tête, Manège de Moscou
 2007 : Galerie Gagosian, Los Angeles
 2007 : Written Photos, Villa Oppenheim, Berlin
 2007 : Transphotographiques, Lille, Eglise St Maurice
 2009 : Beckett, Maison de la Photographie, Lille

Filmography (actor) 
 Chassé-croisé, film by Arielle Dombasle, 1982
 L'Argent, film by Robert Bresson, 1983
 La Nuit porte-jarretelles, film by Virginie Thévenet, 1985
 4 aventures de Reinette et Mirabelle, film by Éric Rohmer, 1987
 L'Arbre, le maire et la médiathèque, film by Éric Rohmer, 1993
 L'Anglaise et le Duc, film by Éric Rohmer, 2001
 L'Heure d'été, film by Olivier Assayas, 2008

References

External links

 
 http://www.quotidien-libre.fr/loreal-bettencourt-proces-cloture/ 

1947 births
Living people
Writers from Paris
French gay writers
French gay artists
Photographers from Paris
20th-century French novelists
21st-century French novelists
20th-century French dramatists and playwrights
21st-century French dramatists and playwrights
French LGBT novelists
French LGBT dramatists and playwrights
French LGBT painters
French LGBT photographers
Gay dramatists and playwrights
Gay novelists
Gay painters
Gay photographers
French male dramatists and playwrights
French male novelists
20th-century French male writers
21st-century French male writers
French prisoners and detainees